Through the Sluice Gates is a 1913 American silent short drama film directed by John G. Adolfi starring William Garwood and Belle Bennett.

External links

1913 drama films
1913 films
Silent American drama films
American silent short films
American black-and-white films
1913 short films
1910s American films